Decker is an unincorporated community in Big Horn County, Montana, United States.

Description
Decker has a post office with ZIP code 59025. The community is home to a one-room public school, the Spring Creek School; it has nine pupils and is one of 200 remaining one-room public schools in the United States.

In the late 1930s, the State Water Conservation Board constructed the Tongue River Dam, creating a reservoir just north of Decker.

Climate
According to the Köppen Climate Classification system, Decker has a semi-arid climate, abbreviated "BSk" on climate maps.

See also

References

External links

Unincorporated communities in Big Horn County, Montana
Unincorporated communities in Montana